James Andrew  (7 September 1829  – 21 April 1897 was an English physician and lecturer on medicine, known as an outstanding teacher.

Andrew was born in Whitby, Yorkshire on 7 September 1829 the youngest son of Reverend James Andrew, Rector of Whitby. After education at home and at Sedbergh School, James Andrew matriculated at Worcester College, Oxford on 9 June 1848. He subsequently obtained a scholarship at Wadham College, Oxford and migrated there, graduating B.A. in 1852 and M.A. in 1856. After a year at Edinburgh, he became a medical student at St Bartholomew's Hospital and graduated there with B.M. degree in 1860. At St Bartholomew's Hospital he was from 1861 to 1867 demonstrator of morbid anatomy, from 1864 to 1869 assistant physician, and from 1869 to 1893 full physician, retiring in 1893 to live in Bournemouth. From 1868 to 1890 he was joint lecturer in medicine at the medical school of St Bartholomew's hospital. Andrew was from 1863 to 1878 physician to the City of London Hospital for Diseases of the Chest. He took his higher doctorate of medicine (D.M.) in 1863. In 1866 he was elected F.R.C.P.

Andrew delivered the Lumleian Lectures (The Aetiology of Phthisis) in 1884 and the Harveian Oration {Conditions of the Pulmonary Circulation) in 1890.

Andrew married Isabelle Simpson in 1867 but they had no children. Andrew died on 21 April 1897 at Moorland House, Tavistock aged 67.

Notes

References

External links
 (portrait by John Collier)

1829 births
1897 deaths
19th-century English medical doctors
People educated at Sedbergh School
Alumni of Wadham College, Oxford
Alumni of the Medical College of St Bartholomew's Hospital
Fellows of the Royal College of Physicians